Mazas is a surname. Notable people with the surname include:

 Jacques Féréol Mazas (1782–1849), French violinist
 Rafael Sánchez Mazas (1894–1966), Spanish writer and member of Franco's Falange movement

See also
 Maza (disambiguation)